The  is an illustrated Japanese leishu encyclopedia published in 1712 in the Edo period. It consists of 105 volumes in 81 books. Its compiler was Terashima or Terajima, a doctor from Osaka. It describes and illustrates various activities of daily life, such as carpentry and fishing, as well as plants and animals, and constellations. It depicts the people of "different/strange lands" (ikoku) and "outer barbarian peoples". Reproductions of the Wakan Sansai Zue are still in print in Japan.

References

External links 

 Scans of the pages are available in the Digital Library of the National Diet Library, Japan.
Samples on the human body from the Japanese encyclopedia
 Scans of copies from the University of Illinois Urbana-Champaign are available at the Internet Archive: volumes 1-8, 9-15, 16-36, 37-47, 48-60, 66-72, 72-77, 78-87, 88-95, 96-105 with index.

Edo-period works
Japanese encyclopedias
18th century in Japan
1712 books
18th-century encyclopedias

Leishu